Swamp Shark is a 2011 low budget American thriller film directed by Griff Furst and starring Kristy Swanson, D. B. Sweeney, Robert Davi, Jason Rogel, Sophia Sinise, Richard Tanne, and Jeff Chase. The film was produced by Kenneth M. Badish and Daniel Lewis and was written by Eric Miller, Charles Bolon, and Jennifer Iwen. It is a Syfy Channel original picture which premiered in the U.S. on the Syfy Channel on June 25, 2011.

Plot
An animal smuggler accidentally releases a large shark into a swamp near a town, and the shark happens to like the taste of humans.

Cast
 Kristy Swanson as Rachel Bouchard
 D. B. Sweeney as Tommy Breysler
 Robert Davi as Sheriff Watson
 Jason Rogel as Martin
 Jeff Chase as Jason "Swamp Thing" Bouchard
 Richard Tanne as Tyler
 Dylan Ramsey as Scott
 Sophie Sinise as Krystal Bouchard
 Wade Boggs as Deputy Stanley
 Ashton Leigh as Amber
 Thomas Tah Hyde III as Marcus
 Charles Harrelson as Noah
 Natacha Itzel as Sarah
 Harold Evans as Jackson
 Lance E. Nichols as Simon

References

External links 
 

2011 television films
2011 films
2010s science fiction horror films
2011 horror films
Films about sharks
American science fiction horror films
Syfy original films
Films about shark attacks
Films directed by Griff Furst
American horror television films
2010s American films